Xuanwumen (Manchu:;Möllendorff:horon be algimbure duka; lit.the gate of military might}});Möllendorff:tob dergi duka; lit. "Gate of the declaration of power"), was a gate in Beijing's former city wall. In the 1960s, the gate was torn down during the construction of the city's subway.  Today, Xuanwumen is a transport node in Beijing as well as the location of Xuanwumen Station on Line 2 and Line 4 of the Beijing Subway.

See also
 Xuanwu District

References

Road transport in Beijing
Gates of Beijing
Neighbourhoods of Beijing
Buildings and structures demolished in the 1960s
Demolished buildings and structures in China